Khana may refer to:

Khana language

Places
Khana, Arghakhanchi, a village in Arghakhanchi district, Nepal
Khana, Nigeria, a Local Government Area in Rivers State
Khana Junction in Bardhaman district, West Bengal, India
Kingdom of Khana in Babylonian times

People
Khana (poet)
Narakorn Khana, footballer from Thailand